Robin Hennessy (born 28 February 1948) is an Irish sailor. He competed in the Dragon event at the 1972 Summer Olympics.

References

External links
 

1948 births
Living people
Irish male sailors (sport)
Olympic sailors of Ireland
Sailors at the 1972 Summer Olympics – Dragon
Place of birth missing (living people)